Garon Park is a recreational park and cricket ground in Southend-on-Sea, Essex, England.

It is currently the home of Old Southendian Football Club and Old Southendian & Southcurch Cricket Club.

Cricket ground 
The ground was first used by the Essex County Cricket Club, 1st XI in 2005. The ground hosted two games in 2008, against Glamorgan in the County Championship and Northamptonshire in the Pro40 League.

The ground has hosted 3 first-class matches and 3 List A matches.

Game information
{| class="wikitable"
|-
! Game Type
! No. of Games
|-
| County Championship Matches
| 3
|-
| limited-over county matches
| 3
|-
| Twenty20 matches
| 0
|}

Game statistics – first-class
{| class="wikitable"
|-
! Category
! Information
|-
| Highest Team Score
| Essex (399 against Somerset) in 2006
|-
| Lowest Team Score
| Essex (88 against Gloucestershire) in 2007
|-
| Best Batting Performance
| Andy Flower (132 Runs for Essex against Durham) in 2005
|-
| Best Bowling Performance
| Steve Kirby (5/41 for Gloucestershire against Essex) in 2007 and Jonathan Lewis (5/41 for Gloucestershire against Essex) in 2007
|}

Game statistics – one-day matches
{| class="wikitable"
|-
! Category
! Information
|-
| Highest Team Score
| Essex (202/8 in 45 overs against Middlesex) in 2005
|-
| Lowest Team Score
| Middlesex (144 in 36.4 overs against Essex) in 2006
|-
| Best Batting Performance
| Paul Weekes (82 Runs for Middlesex against Essex) in 2005
|-
| Best Bowling Performance
| Heath Streak (4/39 for Warwickshire against Essex) in 2007
|}

History 
The ground was named after the Garon family of Southend who were major retailers in the town for several generations.  Norman Garon donated the land to the town in 1885.  The Garons opened a chain of shops, cinemas and banqueting suites at a time when rail travel to the town had started to bring in tourists from London.  One member of the family, Percy Garon, was decorated for his efforts in World War 1 and awarded the George Medal during World War 2 for fighting fires across Essex.  He became chairman of Southend Lifeboat Service and is remembered today by one of the services main boats being named after him.

References 

Cricket grounds in Essex
Buildings and structures in Southend-on-Sea
Essex County Cricket Club